Mats Ronander (born 1 April 1954 in Sundsvall, Sweden) is a Swedish rock musician, guitar player, producer and composer.

Biography
Ronander was born in Sundsvall, but grew up in Örebro. At the age of sixteen he succeeded Peps Persson as singer in the band Blues Quality. He was  a member of the band Nature. The band backed up Ulf Lundell on a tour and three of Lundell's studio album as well as released a few records of their own. Mats Ronander has played live with ABBA on several occasions, as one of their guitarists, such as on their 1979 world tour.

The 1992 single "Gör mig lycklig nu" (written and performed with Dane Kim Larsen) and the album Himlen gråter för Elmore James produced by Mats Ronander, Mats Lindfors and Max Lorentz were Ronander's most successful solo projects. Ronander was also a member of Low budget blues band that released three albums. He was also a member of Grymlings.

Ronander produced Py Bäckman's breakthrough record Sista föreställningen, starred in the screen adaption of Ulf Lundell's novel Sömnen and toured with ABBA in United States. Ronander could clearly be seen upfront, center stage as one of the lead guitarists that performed live on the SVT production "Dick Cavett Meets ABBA" in 1981.

Discography

Albums
Hård kärlek 1981
God bok 1982
50/50 1984
Tokig 1985
Reality 1987
Rock'n'roll Biznis 1989
Himlen gråter för Elmore James 1992
Svenska popfavoriter Mats Ronander (Best of-album) 1995
Innanför staden 1996
Mats 2001
Bästa (Best of-album) 2003
Ronander Live 2006

Soundtracks
Dödlig drift 1999

Singles
"Gör mig lycklig nu" (performed with Kim Larsen) 1992

References

External links

Official website

1954 births
Living people
Swedish male singers
Swedish film score composers
Male film score composers
Melodifestivalen contestants of 2013